Saadatabad-e Olya (also Romanized as Sa‘ādatābād-e ‘Olyā; also known as Sa‘ādatābād-e Bālā) is a village in Rahmat Rural District, Seyyedan District, Marvdasht County, Fars Province, Iran. At the 2006 census, its population was 580, in 133 families.

References 

Populated places in Marvdasht County